Tiruchirappalli BRTS is a proposed bus rapid transit system for the city of Tiruchirappalli.

Background 
During November 2013, at the two-day conference on "Sustainable Cities Through Transport" at Coimbatore, respective city engineers from Madurai, Tiruchi, Tirupur, Salem and Coimbatore came together discussed about planning and creation of transit systems, pedestrian pathways, cycling tracks, parks, pedestrian zones, etc.,.

Modelled on the lines of Ahmedabad BRTS, the plan was developed in association with Institute for Transportation and Development Policy (ITDP) and International Council for Local Environmental Initiatives (ICLEI) is being funded by Ministry of Urban Development would improve the city's road infrastructure and future transport modes, which presently has narrow roads and indiscriminate encroachments coupled with booming vehicle population.

Network

References 

BRTS
Proposed bus rapid transit in India
Proposed infrastructure in Tamil Nadu